139 & Lenox is the second posthumous studio album by American hip hop artist Big L. It was released on August 31, 2010 by Flamboyant. The title of the album refers to the street of Harlem where Big L was raised in.

The 12-song collection of rare and unreleased tracks is a tribute to the revered DITC rapper's hallowed Harlem block, featuring production by the late Roc Raida on "On the Mic (Roc Raida Turntablist Mix)", as well as Big L's former fellow Rawkus artists Hi-Tek and Buckwild. Previously-unheard early mixes to classic L tracks like "Ebonics" and "Platinum Plus" and a live version of L's controversial 1st single "Devil's Son" can be heard alongside rare classics like "Furious Anger."

Track listing

Personnel 
Credits for 139 & Lenox adapted from Allmusic.
 Rich King – executive producer
 Ricky Powell – photography

References

External links 
 139 & Lenox at Allmusic
 Review at Bbarak Magazine

2010 compilation albums
Big L compilation albums
Compilation albums published posthumously